"Bit by a Dead Bee" is the third episode of the second season of the American television crime drama series Breaking Bad. It was written by Peter Gould and directed by Terry McDonough.

Plot
Having gotten away from Tuco Salamanca, Walter White and Jesse Pinkman now have to get home and explain where they have been following their kidnapping. Walt has a plan for both of them and they split up. Walt goes to a supermarket and takes off all of his clothes while walking around the aisles. He is hospitalized and claims to have no memory of where he has been for the last few days. The hospital is unable to find anything wrong with him, and Walt suggests that it was a combination of medication and chemotherapy that could have caused the episode. The hospital believes Walt is at risk for another fugue state and forces him to undergo a psychiatric evaluation. Walt admits to the psychiatrist after receiving assurances regarding patient confidentiality that he remembers everything and just wanted to get away for a while. They eventually agree to release him.

Jesse returns to his house to clean out the basement and get rid of the RV where he and Walt have been making methamphetamine. When the DEA agents track him down, due to Hank Schrader having tracked down Tuco and his uncle Hector while looking for Jesse and deducing a connection after having killed the former, he claims that he has been with a prostitute, Wendy, for the weekend. The DEA does not believe him and brings in Tuco's uncle Hector Salamanca to identify him, but Hector refuses to cooperate with the authorities. They have to let Jesse go. Jesse tries to contact his parents, but they refuse to help him. That night, Walt convinces Jesse to continue cooking meth. Later, Hank gets a present at the station: Tuco's teeth grill encased in a clear acrylic cube.

Production 
The episode was written by Peter Gould and directed by Terry McDonough. It aired on AMC in the United States and Canada on March 22, 2009.

Critical reception 
The episode received very positive reviews from critics. Donna Bowman, writing for The A.V. Club, gave it an A rating. Seth Amitin, writing for IGN, praised that the episode emphasized the "psychological impact that everything Pinkman and Walt have been through, for them, for their families". He gave the episode a 9.8/10.

In 2019 The Ringer ranked "Bit by a Dead Bee" 40th out of the 62 total Breaking Bad episodes.

Notes

References

External links 
 "Bit by a Dead Bee" at the official Breaking Bad site
 

2009 American television episodes
Breaking Bad (season 2) episodes
Television episodes written by Peter Gould